Krishan Pal Gurjar (born 4 February 1957) is an Indian politician and is the present Minister of State of Power and Heavy Industries. As a Member of Parliament in the Lok Sabha, he represents the Faridabad constituency in the state of Haryana. He won this seat in the 2014 Indian general election as a BJP candidate by a margin of 4,66,873 votes and he won election with margin of over 6 lakh in 2019 from Faridabad constituency.

Early life and education
Krishan Pal Gurjar was born in Mewla Maharajpur, Faridabad, Haryana on 4 February 1957 to Hans Raj Zaildar. He completed his graduation from Jawaharlal Nehru College in 1978 and got his law degree from Meerut University.

Career
He won the Corporation Councilor election in 1994 as a Bhartiya Janta Party candidate and became the party's State Minister. He became the Member of Legislative Assembly of Haryana for Mewla–Maharajpur constituency in 1996. He won the MLA seat in next two consecutive terms again. He served as Transport minister in Bansi Lal government from 1996 to 1999. He later served as BJP state President of Haryana.

Gurjar became Member of parliament, Lok Sabha from Faridabad in 2014 Indian general elections by defeating Avtar Singh Bhadana by 4,66,873 votes making him lose his election deposit. He defeated Bhadana again in 2019 Indian general elections by 6.44 lakh votes and became the member of 17th Lok Sabha.

In May 2014, Gurjar became the Minister of State for Road Transport and Highways and Shipping. His ministry was later changed to Social Justice and Empowerment. He continued the position of Minister of State for Social Justice and Empowerment in May 2019 Second Modi ministry. Gurjar’s son and nephew are also politicians. His son Devender Chaudhary being Deputy Mayor of Municipal Corporation of Faridabad and his nephew Utkarsh Chaudhary was Vice President of Delhi University Students Union.

Positions held

Offices held

References

External links 

India MPs 2014–2019
Living people
People from Faridabad
Lok Sabha members from Haryana
Bharatiya Janata Party politicians from Haryana
Members of the Cabinet of India
Narendra Modi ministry
1957 births
Politicians from Faridabad
India MPs 2019–present